The Fiercest Heart is a 1961 American  adventure film in CinemaScope and Color by De Luxe starring Stuart Whitman and Juliet Prowse, also featuring 1960 Summer Olympics decathlon champion Rafer Johnson. It is set in 1830s South Africa and based on the 1955 novel of the same name by Stuart Cloete.

Plot
Three men escape from a prison garrison in South Africa, 1837. As they encounter a tribe of Boers led by Willem Prinsloo who are trekking into the country's interior, one of the fugitives, Steve Bates, a British soldier, immediately develops a romantic interest in Prinsloo's beautiful granddaughter, Francina.

Bates and his fellow escapees, his African friend Nzobo and a brutal criminal, Harry Carter, help hold off a raid by Zulu warriors, but Prinsloo is badly wounded. To the fury of Barent Beyer, a man who loves Francina, her grandfather's last wish before he dies is that Bates now become the group's leader.

The jealous Barent sets an ambush to kill Bates, but before he can, he is felled by a Zulu spear. Carter, too, ends up dead, Bates avenging an assault on Francina. What remains of the group is able to go back to Francina's farm in peace after the Zulu chief is killed in battle by Nzobo.

Cast
 Stuart Whitman as Bates
 Juliet Prowse as Francina
 Raymond Massey as Willem Prinsloo
 Geraldine Fitzgerald as Tante
 Rafer Johnson as Nzobo
 Ken Scott as Carter
 Michael David as Barent

References

External links

The Fiercest Heart at TCMDB

1961 films
Films set in the 1830s
Films set in South Africa
20th Century Fox films
Films directed by George Sherman
Films based on British novels
Films based on South African novels
1960s historical adventure films
American historical adventure films
1960s English-language films
1960s American films